Valentin Constantin Țicu (born 19 September 2000) is a Romanian professional footballer who plays as a left-back for Liga I club Petrolul Ploiești, which he captains.

Club career
Țicu is a youth product of Petrolul Ploiești and made his senior debut for the team on 28 September 2018, playing the full 90 minutes in a 5–0 Liga II thrashing of Aerostar Bacău. On 13 October 2019, he scored his first goal in a 3–0 league defeat of Daco-Getica București.

Țicu aided with 26 appearances and three goals in the 2021–22 season, as "the Yellow-Blues" won the championship and earned promotion to the Liga I. He recorded his debut in the latter competition by starting in a 0–1 home loss to Voluntari, on 18 July 2022.

Career statistics

Club

Honours
Petrolul Ploiești
Liga II: 2021–22

References

External links
Valentin Țicu at Liga Profesionistă de Fotbal 

2000 births
Living people
Sportspeople from Ploiești
Romanian footballers
Association football fullbacks
Liga I players
Liga II players
FC Petrolul Ploiești players
Romania youth international footballers
Romania under-21 international footballers